Robert Ledes of Lincoln was an English politician.

He was elected Mayor of Lincoln for 1387–88 and Mayor of the Boston Staple for 1390–91.

He was a Member (MP) of the Parliament of England for Lincoln in 1382, 1391 and 1395.

References

Year of birth missing
Year of death missing
English MPs May 1382
Members of the Parliament of England (pre-1707) for Lincoln
Mayors of Lincoln, England
English MPs 1391
English MPs 1395